Staten Island Law is an American reality documentary television series on the Oprah Winfrey Network. The series debuted on January 12, 2013, and follows the lives of two Staten Island housewives who are best friends and both work as mediators. The series was pulled off the broadcasting schedule after four episodes due to low viewership and the last two episodes aired in October 2013.

Episodes

References

2010s American reality television series
2013 American television series debuts
2013 American television series endings
Oprah Winfrey Network original programming
English-language television shows